Hargicourt may refer to the following places in France:

 Hargicourt, Aisne, a commune in the department of Aisne
 Hargicourt, Somme, a commune in the department of Somme